The 15467 / 68 Siliguri Junction -Bamanhat Express is an Express train belonging to Indian Railways Northeast Frontier Railway zone that runs between  and  of West Bengal in India.

Timings
The train travels entirely in West Bengal.

Coaches
The 15467 / 68 Siliguri Junction - Bamanhat Express has nine general unreserved & two SLR (seating with luggage rake) coaches . It does not carry a pantry car coach.

As is customary with most train services in India, coach composition may be amended at the discretion of Indian Railways depending on demand.

Traction

Routing
The 15467 / 68 Siliguri Junction - Bamanhat  Express runs from 
 via 
 
 Sivok Junction
 Bagrakote Railway Station
 Odlabari Railway Station
 Damdim Railway Station
New Malbazar Junction
Banarhat Railway Station
 Binnaguri Junction
Dalgaon Railway Station
Hasimara Railway Station

 Dewanhat Railway Station
 Dinhata railway station to
 Bamanhat railway station.

Rake Sharing
The train shares its rake with Balurghat–Siliguri Intercity Express.

References

Transport in Siliguri
Rail transport in West Bengal
Express trains in India